Major-General John Anthony Ward-Booth  (18 July 1927 – 25 August 2002) was a British Army officer.

Military career
Educated at Worksop College, Ward-Booth was commissioned into the Worcestershire Regiment in 1946. He became commanding officer of 3rd Battalion the Parachute Regiment in 1967. He went on to be commander of 16 Parachute Brigade in 1970, Deputy Adjutant General, Headquarters, British Army of the Rhine in 1974 and Director, Army Air Corps in 1976. His last appointment was as General Officer Commanding (GOC) Western District in 1979 before retiring in 1982.

In 1952 he married Margaret Joan Hooper: they had two sons and two daughters.

References

 

1927 births
2002 deaths
People educated at Worksop College
British Army major generals
Officers of the Order of the British Empire
Worcestershire Regiment officers
Deputy Lieutenants of Hampshire